Andy Adams (May 3, 1859 – September 26, 1935) was an American writer of western fiction.

Life and career
Andy Adams was born in Thorncreek Township, Whitley County, Indiana, the son of Andrew Adams, who was of Irish descent, and Elizabeth Elliott, who was of Scottish descent. As a boy, he helped with the cattle and horses on the family farm. During the early 1880s, he went to Texas, where he stayed for 10 years, spending much of that time driving cattle on the western trails. In 1890, he tried working as a businessman, but the venture failed, so he tried gold-mining in Colorado and Nevada. In 1894, he settled in Colorado Springs, where he lived until his death.

He began writing at the age of 43, publishing his most successful book, The Log of a Cowboy, in 1903. His other works include A Texas Matchmaker (1904), The Outlet (1905), Cattle Brands (1906), Reed Anthony, Cowman: An Autobiography (1907), Wells Brothers (1911), and The Ranch on the Beaver (1927).

The Log of a Cowboy is an account of a five-month drive of 3,000 cattle from Brownsville, Texas, to Montana during 1882 along the Great Western Cattle Trail. Although the book is fiction, it is based on Adams's own experiences, and it is considered by many to be literature's best account of cowboy life. Adams was disgusted by the unrealistic cowboy fiction being published in his time; The Log of a Cowboy was his response. It is still in print, and even modern reviewers consider it compelling. The Chicago Herald said: "As a narrative of cowboy life, Andy Adams' book is clearly the real thing. It carries its own certificate of authentic first-hand experience on every page."

Works 
1903:  The Log of a Cowboy.
1904:  A Texas Matchmaker.
1905:  The Outlet.
1906:  Cattle Brands: A Collection of Western Camp-fire Stories - contains 14 short stories.
1907:  Reed Anthony, Cowman: An Autobiography - Adams breathes life into the story of a Texas cowboy who becomes a wealthy and influential cattleman.
1911:  The Wells Brothers: The Young Cattle Kings - Tells the tale of two orphaned boys who, against all odds and in the face of numerous calamities, establish their own cattle ranch. It was followed by a sequel, The Ranch on the Beaver (1927).
1927:  The Ranch on the Beaver: A Sequel to Wells Brothers.

References

Further reading
 Carter, Harvey L.  "Retracing a Cattle Drive: Andy Adams's 'The Log of a Cowboy, Arizona & the West (1981) 23#4 pp 355–378.
 Molen, Dayle H. "Andy Adams: Classic Novelist of the Trail", Montana: The Magazine of Western History (1969) 19#1 pp 24–35.

External links 

 
 
 
Works by Andy Adams, in HTML at Classic Reader
Review of Log of a Cowboy

1859 births
1935 deaths
Novelists from Colorado
Cowboys
Western (genre) writers
20th-century American novelists
20th-century American male writers
American male novelists
Novelists from Indiana
Writers from Colorado Springs, Colorado